Casey Anne Ramirez (born December 8, 1989) is an American soccer defender who most recently played for the Portland Thorns FC of the National Women's Soccer League (NWSL). She previously played for Fortuna Hjørring in Denmark's Elitedivisionen.

Early life
Born to Joe and Phyllis Ramerez, Casey was raised in Yardley, Pennsylvania, where she attended The Pennington School. A committed athlete, Ramirez played soccer, softball, basketball, lacrosse and ran track for the school. During her junior year, she helped the soccer team win the McDonough Tournament in Baltimore. The team was ranked first in the country. The same year, Ramirez was named to the Trenton Times First-Team All-Prep "A" team as a midfielder. During her senior year, she captained the team to the New Jersey state title for the fourth consecutive year and was named for a second time to the Trenton Times First-Team All-Prep "A" team – this time as a defender.

Syracuse University
Ramirez attended Syracuse University, where she played for the Syracuse Orange from 2008 to 2011. She made 75 appearances as a defender for the team scoring 3 goals and serving 4 assists.

Playing career

Club

Fortuna Hjørring, 2012
Ramirez signed with Fortuna Hjørring in Denmark's Elitedivisionen for the 2012–13 season. The team finished second during regular season play. Ramirez made two appearances for the club during the 2012–13 UEFA Women's Champions League Round of 16.

Portland Thorns FC, 2013
Ramirez was signed by the Portland Thorns FC as a discovery player a couple of months into inaugural 2013 season with the National Women's Soccer League. Of the signing, Thorns FC head coach Cindy Parlow Cone said, "Casey is a very good attacking outside back or midfielder. She is very difficult to beat one-on-one and is great at helping to build the attack out of the back." She made four appearances for the club during the regular season tallying 160 minutes. February 8, 2014 the Thorns released Ramirez.

References

External links
 Portland Thorns FC player profile 
 Syracuse University player profile
 

1989 births
Living people
American women's soccer players
Fortuna Hjørring players
Portland Thorns FC players
Soccer players from Pennsylvania
Syracuse Orange women's soccer players
Women's association football defenders
National Women's Soccer League players
New Jersey Wildcats players
People from Yardley, Pennsylvania
The Pennington School alumni
Ottawa Fury (women) players
USL W-League (1995–2015) players
Expatriate women's soccer players in Canada
American expatriate sportspeople in Canada
Expatriate women's footballers in Denmark
American expatriate sportspeople in Denmark
Elitedivisionen players